Gleditsia japonica, the Japanese locust, is a species of flowering plant in the family Fabaceae, native to the eastern Himalayas, central and southern China, Manchuria, Korea, and central and southern Japan. It is used as a street tree in a number of cities in China and Europe.

Subtaxa
The following varieties are accepted:
Gleditsia japonica var. delavayi  – eastern Himalayas, south-central China
Gleditsia japonica var. japonica – southeastern China, north-central China, Manchuria, Korea, Japan
Gleditsia japonica var. stenocarpa  – Korea
Gleditsia japonica var. velutina  – southeastern China

References

japonica
Flora of East Himalaya
Flora of Southeast China
Flora of South-Central China
Flora of North-Central China
Flora of Manchuria
Flora of Korea
Flora of Japan
Plants described in 1867